Big Poplar Tree is an unincorporated community located in Woodford County, Kentucky, United States.

References

Unincorporated communities in Woodford County, Kentucky
Unincorporated communities in Kentucky